Jenny Ann Biggs (
Mollen) is an American actress and published writer and essayist. She played Nina Ash on the television series Angel (2003–04). She appeared on the series  Viva Laughlin (2007), Crash (2008), and Girls (2014). 

Mollen has published two collections of essays, and has written articles for various publications, including Cosmopolitan and Parents. She has appeared on the New York Times Best Seller list twice with her books I Like You Just The Way I Am (2014) and Live Fast Die Hot (2016).

Early life
Mollen was born in Phoenix, Arizona.  Mollen's father is Jewish and her mother is Christian, she was raised culturally Jewish. She has a sister and a half-brother. In the late 1990s, Mollen graduated from Chaparral High School in Scottsdale, Arizona. She studied theater and graduated from UCLA School of Theater, Film and Television. Mollen briefly attended graduate school to study psychology.  

Mollen worked in local theater as a child.  She worked at Old Globe Theatre in San Diego, California, the Idyllwild Arts Academy, and the Oregon Shakespeare Festival in Ashland, Oregon.

Career

Acting 
In 2005, Mollen announced in an interview about her plans to perform in London in a play she wrote about her dog.

In 2009, Mollen wrote the short film Kidnapping Caitlynn, which stars Jason Biggs, Julie Benz and herself. The film is directed by Katherine Cunningham Eves.

In 2016, Mollen co-starred with her husband Jason Biggs as fictional husband and wife characters in comedy film Amateur Night.

Writing 
In 2012 and 2013, Mollen wrote a humor column for The Smoking Jacket, a website affiliated with Playboy, as well as an advice column for Playboy.

In January 2013, Mollen's signed with St. Martin's Press to write a book of comedic essays, I Like You Just The Way I Am. The book reached #10 on The New York Times Best Seller list for Print & E-Book Nonfiction on its debut in June 2014. On August 4, 2016, it was announced that ABC Digital acquired a single-camera comedy written and starring Mollen based on her NYT Best Seller I Like You Just The Way I Am.

In June 2016, Mollen published a follow-up, Live Fast Die Hot, which also subsequently became New York Times Best Seller at #8 in Humor. In August 2016, it was reported that the film rights had been acquired by Warner Bros. with Anne Hathaway attached to star and Mollen attached to write and executive produce.

Personal life
Mollen met actor Jason Biggs while filming My Best Friend's Girl and they were engaged by January 2008. On April 23, 2008, the couple eloped and got married in Los Angeles, California. In July 2008, they had a formal wedding ceremony in Napa Valley. 

Their son, Sid, was born on February 15, 2014. Their second son, Lazlo was born on October 2, 2017. After living in Los Angeles for some time, the Biggs family moved to New York City in 2018.

Mollen speaks German fluently.

Filmography

Selected works and publications

Books

Periodicals

References

External links

Actresses from Phoenix, Arizona
American film actresses
American television actresses
21st-century American memoirists
21st-century American actresses
Living people
University of California, Los Angeles alumni
Jewish American actresses
21st-century American women writers
Writers from Phoenix, Arizona
American women memoirists
21st-century American Jews
Year of birth missing (living people)